Jack Arnold Weil (March 28, 1901 – August 13, 2008) was the founder and CEO of the Denver-based Western clothing manufacturer Rockmount Ranch Wear and was believed to be the oldest working CEO in the United States.

Weil was born in Evansville, Indiana in 1901. In 1926, Weil (also known as Papa or "Papa Jack") married Beatrice Baum, and two years later the couple moved to Denver, Colorado, with their newborn son, Jack B. Seven years later, their daughter, Jane, was born, and in 1946, Weil rented a space at 1946 Wazee Street in Denver and set about trying to create a fashionable yet practical identity for the western ranchers of the region. Rockmount's fashions were featured prominently in the 2005 Academy Award-winning film Brokeback Mountain.  Weil had five grandchildren—Greg, Gail, Janet, Steven, and Judy—all of whom worked at some point for the company.  His grandson, Steven Weil, now runs the operation.  Weil also had ten great-grandchildren, eight girls and three boys.

Weil was well known for coining the phrase "The West is not a place, it is a state of mind."  He was the first person to put snaps on Western shirts, patented the saw-tooth pocket design seen on many Western shirts, and is credited with inventing the bolo tie.

Weil's wife died in 1990, followed by his son Jack B. in 2008.

He claimed to have quit smoking at age 60, drinking at age 90 and eating red meat at 100.  However, Weil said he had a shot of Jack Daniel's twice a week for "medicinal purposes," specifically, to keep his blood thin.

Weil died at home, surrounded by family, on August 13, 2008.

Notes

References

 Martin, Douglas.  "Jack A. Weil, the Cowboy’s Dresser, Dies at 107," New York Times.  August 14, 2008.
 Jack A. Weil, patriarch of western clothing, died on August 13th, aged 107," The Economist (print edition). August 28, 2008.

1901 births
2008 deaths
American centenarians
American chief executives of manufacturing companies
Men centenarians
People from Evansville, Indiana